The Neue Zürcher Zeitung (NZZ; "New Journal of Zürich") is a Swiss, German-language daily newspaper, published by NZZ Mediengruppe in Zürich. The paper was founded in 1780. It was described as having a reputation as a high-quality newspaper, as the Swiss-German newspaper of record, and for objective and detailed reports on international affairs.

History and profile

One of the oldest newspapers still published, it originally appeared as Zürcher Zeitung, edited by the Swiss painter and poet Salomon Gessner, on 12 January 1780, and was renamed as Neue Zürcher Zeitung in 1821.

According to Peter K. Buse and Jürgen C. Doerr many prestige German language newspapers followed its example because it set "standards through an objective, in-depth treatment of subject matter, eloquent commentary, an extensive section on entertainment, and one on advertising."

Aside from the switch from its blackletter typeface in 1946, the newspaper has changed little since the 1930s. Only since 2005 has it added color pictures, much later than most mainstream papers. The emphasis is on international news, business, finance, and high culture. Features and lifestyle stories are kept to a minimum.

Politically, the newspaper has been positioned close to the liberal Free Democratic Party of Switzerland since its early period. It has a liberal and centre-right orientation. 

The appointment of Eric Gujer as editor-in-chief in 2015 and René Scheu as head of the feature section in 2016, as well as almost half of all contributing editors leaving the newspaper between 2015 and December 2017, marked a noticeable shift to the right, according to critics.

Circulation
The circulation of Neue Zürcher Zeitung was 18,100 copies in 1910. It rose to 47,500 copies in 1930 and 66,600 copies in 1950.

In 1997, the Neue Zürcher Zeitung had a circulation of 162,330 copies. Its circulation was 169,000 copies in 2000. The circulation of the paper was 166,000 copies in 2003. The 2006 circulation of the paper was 146,729 copies. Its circulation was 139,732 copies in 2009. In 2010, the paper had a circulation of 136,894 copies.

Weekend edition
In 2002, the newspaper launched a weekend edition, NZZ am Sonntag (NZZ on Sunday). The weekend edition has its own editorial staff and contains more soft news and lifestyle issues than its weekday counterpart, as do most Swiss weekend newspapers. Its circulation was 121,204 copies in 2006.

NZZ am Sonntag was awarded the European Newspaper of the Year in the category of weekly newspaper by the European Newspapers Congress in 2012.

Archives
In 2005, the complete run of the newspaper's first 225 years was scanned from microfilm. A total of two million images comprising seventy terabytes, and its Blackletter type was scanned using optical character recognition at a total cost of €600,000 (or €0.30 per image). The result is a searchable digital archive, accessible online by subscribers and publicly on site in Zurich.

The digitization was carried out by an institute of the German research organization Fraunhofer Society the Institute for Media Communication (since 2006, the ), headquartered in Sankt Augustin, North Rhine-Westphalia.

NZZ Libro
NZZ Libro is the book publisher of the Neue Zürcher Zeitung (NZZ). Books have been published since 1927; since 1980, the publishing house has been run as a separate profit centre. Since 2006 the publishing house has been operating under the name NZZ Libro. The publishing programme of specialist and non-fiction literature includes, among other things, political, cultural, historical and economic books, as well as biographies and illustrated books, predominantly with a Swiss reference.

Award
The Neue Zürcher Zeitung was the recipient of the 1979 Erasmus Prize.

See also
 List of newspapers in Switzerland

Notes and references

Further reading
 Luchsinger, Fred. Neue Zürcher Zeitung im Zeitalter des zweiten Weltkrieges, 1930–1955 (Zürich: Neue Zürcher Zeitung, 1955)
 Merrill, John C. and Harold A. Fisher. The world's great dailies: profiles of fifty newspapers (1980) pp. 211–219
 NZZ (Zürich: Neue Zürcher Zeitung, 2013)
 Wiskemann, Elizabeth. A great swiss newspaper: the story of the Neue Zürcher Zeitung (Oxford University Press, 1959)
 Friedemann Bartu: Umbruch. Die Neue Zürcher Zeitung. Ein kritisches Porträt. Orell Füssli, Zurich 2020, ISBN 978-3-280-05716-2.

External links

  

18th-century establishments in the Old Swiss Confederacy
1780 establishments in Europe
Daily newspapers published in Switzerland
German-language newspapers published in Switzerland
Newspapers published in Zürich
Newspapers established in 1780
Swiss news websites
Liberal media